Grevillea spinosa, commonly known as tjiilka-tjiilka, is species of flowering plant in the family Proteaceae and is endemic to inland Western Australia.  It is a dense, prickly shrub with mostly pinnatipartite leaves with rigid, sharply-pointed linear lobes, and erect clusters of reddish to blackish green flowers with a bright yellow to orange style.

Description 
The edges of the leaves are rolled under, enclosing the lower surface apart from the midvein.

TaxonomyGrevillea spinosa was first formally described by the botanist Donald McGillivray in 1986 as a part of the work New Names in Grevillea (Proteaceae) from specimens collected on the Canning Stock Route in 1942.
The specific epithet (spinosa'') is means "spiny", referring to the leaves.

Distribution
Tjiilka-tjiilka is found around Wiluna from the Canning Stock Route to the Little Sandy Desert and as far south as Yeelirrie Station. It grows on stony ridges and in gravelly, sandy or loamy soils often over sandstone.

Conservation status
This grevillea is listed as "not threatened" by the Government of Western Australia Department of Biodiversity, Conservation and Attractions.

See also
 List of Grevillea species

References

spinosa
Proteales of Australia
Eudicots of Western Australia
Taxa named by Donald McGillivray
Plants described in 1986